Jon Bryant (born 22 January 1986) is a Canadian singer-songwriter. Native born to Halifax but now based in Vancouver, British Columbia, Bryant writes and sings acoustically melodic songs with a maritime influence.

Early life 
Bryant was born in Halifax, Nova Scotia. Growing up in Fall River, NS, he attended George P. Vanier Junior  School and Lockview High School. Bryant graduated in 2004 from Caronport High School in Saskatchewan. He studied piano, and later learned to play guitar and drums. He attended Nova Scotia College of Art and Design.

He currently resides in Vancouver with his wife Bree (Woodill) Bryant, an actress and model from Halifax.

Career 
As well as writing and singing his own songs, Bryant has toured throughout North America and Europe and is an artist advocate for World Vision while performing with Canadian music group Starfield.

Bryant's debut album, Two Coasts for Comfort, released on 29 October 2009, was iTunes Canada's "Featured Singer/Songwriter Album of 2009" and garnered a 2011 East Coast Music Award nomination for "Folk Album of the Year".

In May 2012, Bryant released his follow-up album, What Takes You, which featured a number of Canadian musicians, including JUNO Award winner Meaghan Smith, and guitarist Jason Mingo.

Bryant has twice performed at the Juno Awards ceremony.

In addition to his work in the music industry, Bryant is also an actor and voice actor. He has appeared in Big Sky, Arrow, Marvel: Sentinel of the Spaceways, and Riverdale.

Discography

Albums
2009: Two Coasts for Comfort
2012: What Takes You
2016: Twenty Something
2019: Cult Classic

Singles and EPs
2020: Half Bad
2021: Back to Love
2021: Psychldyllic Salutations
2021: "The Great Reveal" (with Nina June)
2022: "California"
2022: "would you call me up?"
2022: "This Book"

Awards and achievements 

East Coast Music Awards
 2011 – Folk Album of the Year Two Coasts for Comfort (nomination)
Music Nova Scotia Awards
 2010 – Best New Artist (nominated)
 2010 – Digital Artist of the Year (nominated)
 2010 – Inspirational Artist of the Year (nominated)
Covenant Awards
 2010 – Best Folk Album Two Coasts For Comfort (nominated)
iTunes Canada
 "Deaf" – iTunes "Single of the Week" – January 2010
 Two Coasts for Comfort – iTunes Featured Singer/Songwriter Album of 2009
 iTunes "Indie Spotlight" – February 2010
TV/Film Placements
 "David Livingstone" – Rookie Blue Season 4 "Skeletons"
 "Evening Sun" – Rookie Blue Season 3 "Every Man"
 "David Livingstone" – Degrassi: The Next Generation Season 12 "Waterfalls (1)"
 "The Weekend" – Less Than Kind
 “I Shall Not Fear” - Manifest Season 4 “Relative Bearing”

References

External links 
 jonbryant.ca
 CBC Artist – Jon Bryant

Canadian singer-songwriters
1986 births
Living people
Musicians from Halifax, Nova Scotia
21st-century Canadian male singers
Canadian male singer-songwriters